Viso del Marqués is a municipality located in the province of Ciudad Real, Castile-La Mancha, Spain. According to the 2014 census, The municipality has a population of 2,578 inhabitants.

It is the site of the Palace of the Marquis of Santa Cruz, built in the late sixteenth century by Álvaro de Bazán, 1st Marquess of Santa Cruz. Álvaro de Bazan was a senior  admiral in the Spanish Navy, and created the concept of the Spanish Armadabut died before it was deployed to attack England. The Marquis's palace has been repurposed as the modern headquarters of the National Archive of the Spanish Navy.

References

External links

Municipalities in the Province of Ciudad Real